Water is the soundtrack to the 2005 film of the same name. It was released on 20 December 2005 by labels Sony BMG in India and Varèse Sarabande internationally. The songs were composed by A. R. Rahman and the background score of the film was composed by Mychael Danna.

Overview
The album has 21 songs in total, 15 Instrumental pieces by Mychael Danna and 6 Hindi songs composed by A. R. Rahman with lyrics by Sukhwinder Singh and Raqeeb Alam, except for the song Vaishnava Janatho (which is a famous 15th century bhajan in Gujarati composed and lyricized by Narsinh Mehta). However, A. R. Rahman introduced new orchestration with new singers. The soundtrack was released by international label, Varèse Sarabande but it is distributed in India by Sony BMG. The Indian release contains only the 6 Hindi songs composed by A.R. Rahman. Rahman has rated this as his only album which he would give a 10/10.  The song Aayo Re Sakhi (Chan Chan) was considered for the Best Original Song nomination in the 2007 Academy Awards.

The album kicks off with Aayo Re Sakhi, a song composed in the style of Hindustani classical music, which uses only rich Indian music instruments and is regarded as a master piece of the composer as well as vocalists Sadhana Sargam and Sukhwinder Singh. The next two tracks sung by Sadhana Sargam are noted especially for the rendition and use of soft instruments. They are soft in temper and is quite off-beat but their strength lie in the somber backdrops of the rhythm. The fourth track Sham Rang Bhar Do, beautifully penned by professional lyricist Raqeeb Alam is a Holi festival song and is beautifully sung by noted classical singer Richa Sharma and other male vocalists. The bhajan Vaishnava Janatho was not composed by A.R. Rahman, but the elements of the chant was completely modified by him. The final track Bhangari Morori is highly inspired by water, one of the five elements. It uses the flow of water in the background at various portions similar to some earlier tracks, in which the composer used many sounds from the nature. The extra tracks in the international release, by Mychael Danna use rich western music instruments which make the film, a perfect blende of Indian classical music and Western Classical Music.

Director Deepa Mehta commented about the soundtrack: "The music that has been created for Water is simply breath-taking…It has the makings of a phenomenal soundtrack". Kaushiki Chakrabarty, who sang one of the songs, commented that "Water was a wonderful experience. I didn't even realize I was singing for a film or that A.R. Rahman was recording a song. I sang all the variations I could conceive of. It was like rediscovering myself".

Track listing

Indian Release

International Release

References

A. R. Rahman soundtracks
Hindi film soundtracks
2005 soundtrack albums